Potassium voltage-gated channel subfamily S member 1 is a protein that in humans is encoded by the KCNS1 gene. The protein encoded by this gene is a voltage-gated potassium channel subunit.

References

Further reading

External links 
 
 

Ion channels